Phi Sigma Tau (or PST) is an international honor society for philosophers. Its essential purpose is to promote ties among philosophy departments in accredited institutions and students in philosophy nationally. In addition to providing a means of awarding distinction to students having high scholarship and interest in philosophy, Phi Sigma Tau also promotes interest in philosophy among the general collegiate public.

The current membership requirements are variable from chapter to chapter, but in general, undergraduate students are eligible for active membership if they have completed two semesters of college, rank in the upper 35% of their class, and have completed at least two semester courses in philosophy with an average overall grade which is greater than the second highest grade of the working scale. The society also inducts graduate students, professors, and non-affiliated personnel. There are currently 200 active chapters in the U.S. and Canada, with 31301 members.

History
The society was founded in 1930 at Muhlenberg College as "Alpha Kappa Alpha," with chapters in Pennsylvania and Maryland. The society was incorporated as Phi Sigma Tau in 1955 and in 1958 the society was admitted to membership in the Association of College Honor Societies. In 1991 PST became an international society with the installation of its first Canadian chapter.

Purpose
The mission of Phi Sigma Tau is
 To serve as a means of awarding distinction to students having high scholarship and personal interest in philosophy;
 To promote student interest in research and advanced study in this field; 
 To provide opportunities for the publication of student research papers of merit; 
 To encourage a professional spirit and friendship among those who have displayed marked ability in this field; 
 To popularize interest in philosophy among the general collegiate public."

Publications
Since 1955, the society has published a biannual philosophy journal called Dialogue, which publishes articles from the entire field of philosophy, regardless of whether the contributor is a member of Phi Sigma Tau. Articles are accepted from undergraduate and graduate students but not from those with terminal degrees. Dialogue appears in October and April of each academic year. Phi Sigma Tau also publishes a newsletter three times yearly, which provides for communication among chapters and members.

Traditions
The emblem of Phi Sigma Tau is in the shape of a pentagon; each of the five angles contains a symbol that represents one of the five streams of world thought: Chinese, Indian, Islamic, Hebrew, and Greek. The seal of Phi Sigma Tau is the reverse side of the Athenian silver tetradrachm, which bears the owl of Pallas Athene, the goddess of wisdom and rational inquiry, an olive spray, a small crescent, and the name of Athena in Greek. The margin of the seal bears the name of the society. The colors of Phi Sigma Tau are white and purple.

The motto of Phi Sigma Tau is Φιλούντων σοφίαν τιμή (Philoúnton sophían timé), Greek for "the honor of those who love wisdom."

Notes

References

External links
National Phi Sigma Tau Website
Michigan Iota Chapter's Phi Sigma Tau Page
Extended PST History
  ACHS Phi Sigma Tau entry
  Phi Sigma Tau chapter list at ACHS

Association of College Honor Societies
Honor societies
Philosophical societies in the United States
Student organizations established in 1930
1930 establishments in Pennsylvania